Baptiste Lalieu better known as Saule sometimes stylized SAULE in all capital letters, (born September 25, 1977) is a Belgian singer-songwriter who has found recognition and chart success with his single "Dusty Men" (featuring Charlie Winston) followed by his album Géant, that includes French music with Anglo-Saxon rock sound and country music influences. He is signed to the "30 février" record label.

Saule started writing music releasing his first EP, Saule, of four tracks on "30 février" in November 2005, followed by his first album Vous êtes ici in March 2006 on the same label with distribution rights to the Bang label. The January 2009 album Western with eleven titles and four bonus tracks with heavy traditional country music influences was also marketed in France and Switzerland through Polydor in addition to Belgium. Géant, released in November 2012, has had chart success in France. Saule later ventured into acting, starring in the film The Benefit of the Doubt (2017), which earned him a Magritte Award nomination in the category of Most Promising Actor.

Discography

Albums

EPs
Saule EP (November 2005)

Singles

Soundtracks
Cow-boy (soundtrack of film directed by Benoît Mariage) (December 2007)

References

External links
Official website
Facebook
YouTube
30 février record label

Belgian male singers
Belgian songwriters
Living people
1977 births